
Oborniki County is a unit of territorial administration and local government (powiat) in Greater Poland Voivodeship, west-central Poland. It came into being on January 1, 1999, as a result of the Polish local government reforms passed in 1998.

As of 2006 its total population is 55,976, out of which the population of Oborniki is 17,850, that of Rogoźno is 10,905, and the rural population is 27,221.

Neighbouring counties
Oborniki County is bordered by Czarnków-Trzcianka County and Chodzież County to the north, Wągrowiec County to the east, Poznań County to the south, and Szamotuły County to the west.

Administrative division
The county is subdivided into three gminas (two urban-rural and one rural). These are listed in the following table, in descending order of population.

References
Polish official population figures 2006

 
Oborniki